Bridge in Athens Township was a historic Pennsylvania (petit) truss bridge in Athens Township and Athens, Bradford County, Pennsylvania. It spanned the Susquehanna River.

The bridge was listed on the National Register of Historic Places in 1988. It was replaced by a new bridge in 2005 and delisted from the National Register in 2012.

References

Road bridges on the National Register of Historic Places in Pennsylvania
Bridges completed in 1916
Bridges in Bradford County, Pennsylvania
1916 establishments in Pennsylvania
National Register of Historic Places in Bradford County, Pennsylvania
2005 disestablishments in Pennsylvania
Steel bridges in the United States
Former National Register of Historic Places in Pennsylvania